Strothmann may refer to

Frederick Strothmann (1872–1958), illustrator  
Markus Strothmann, jazz drummer
 Rudolf Strothmann (1877–1960), German historian of Islam
 Lena Strothmann (born 1952), German CDU politician, Bundestag member for Bielefeld – Gütersloh II 2013–2017
 Strothmann Weizenkorn, a variety of Korn (liquor)